Stacy L. Garrity is an American politician, businesswoman, and soldier. She is currently serving as Pennsylvania Treasurer as a Republican, a position to which she was elected in 2020. She previously served in the United States Army Reserve for 30 years and through three deployments during the Gulf War and Iraq War, where she was called "The Angel of the Desert" by other US military officers. She left the Army Reserve in 2016 at the rank of colonel. Garrity worked at Global Tungsten & Powders Corp. from 1987 to 2021, where she reached the level of Vice President. In 2019, Garrity entered politics and ran for the Republican nomination for a special election in Pennsylvania's 12th congressional district, but lost to Fred Keller, who went on to win in the general election.

In 2020, Garrity ran for Pennsylvania Treasurer against incumbent Democrat Joe Torsella, winning the Republican nomination unopposed. She defeated Torsella in the general election in an upset, having been outraised financially and consistently down in the polls.

Early life 
Garrity is a native of Athens, Pennsylvania in Bradford County. She attended Sayre Area High School in Sayre, Pennsylvania and later graduated from Bloomsburg University of Pennsylvania with a degree in finance and economics, later earning a certificate from the Cornell University Business Management Institute.

Military career 
Garrity served in the US Army Reserve from 1986 to 2016, reaching a final rank of colonel. While in the Army Reserve, Garrity acted as a Military Police officer. Garrity was deployed three times during her military career: in 1991 for Operation Desert Storm, and in 2003–2004 as well as 2008–2009 for the Iraq War.

Garrity was stationed at Camp Bucca in southern Iraq during the Iraq War. She worked to process detainees, manage family visitations, and act as a Red Cross liaison. It was here Garrity obtained the nickname "The Angel of the Desert" or "The Angel of Camp Bucca" for her affection when dealing with the prisoners housed at the camp. Garrity earned two Bronze Stars and the Legion of Merit before retiring in 2016.

Business career 
Garrity worked at Global Tungsten & Powders Corp. (GTP) from 1987 to 2021. GTP is a producer of tungsten and metallurgic products based in Pennsylvania. Before leaving GTP to become Pennsylvania Treasurer, Garrity's final position at the company was Vice President for Government Affairs and Industry Liaison. In 2018, while Garrity managed government affairs for Global Tungsten & Powders, she successfully lobbied Congress to ban the US military from purchasing any tungsten from China, Russia, North Korea, and Iran.

In 2017, Global Tungsten & Powders was sued in federal court by a competitor company, Tungsten Heavy Powder and Parts, for defamation. Tungsten Heavy Powder and Parts alleged that Garrity spread defamatory statements about them at an industry event.

Political career

Congressional campaign 
In 2019, Garrity ran for the Republican nomination in a special election for Pennsylvania's 12th Congressional district after the resignation of incumbent Tom Marino. Garrity lost the nomination to Fred Keller, who was supported by President Donald Trump and eventually won the seat. After losing the Congressional nomination, Garrity pursued the open 2020 race for Treasurer.

Pennsylvania Treasurer

Election 

Garrity challenged incumbent Democrat Joe Torsella for Pennsylvania Treasurer in January 2020, winning the Republican nomination unopposed in June. Garrity charged that Torsella was mainly interested in the office to boost his profile and run for higher office, such as the state's governorship. She criticized Torsella's management of the office and alleged a lack of transparency, citing a D− rating given by the Public Interest Research Group in 2019.

On November 10, 2020, a week after election day, Torsella called Garrity to concede the race, with Garrity leading by 78,000 votes at the time of his concession. It was the first time a Republican had unseated an incumbent Democrat for a statewide office in Pennsylvania since 1994.

Tenure 
In May 2021, Garrity joined a critical letter sent by several Republican state treasurers to the Biden administration, charging that the administration was inappropriately encouraging financial institutions to stop supporting fossil fuels. The letter said that the government should not "bully corporations into curtailing legal activities," but it also threatened that the state governments represented by the signatory officials may divest their state funds from any banks that no longer support fossil fuel projects. Garrity's participation in this letter was criticized by an editorial of the Hazelton Standard-Speaker.

In honor of National College Savings Day in 2021, Garrity had the Pennsylvania Treasury offer $100 to families that opened 529 college savings plans.

In 2021, in her ex-officio capacity on the board of the Pennsylvania Public School Employees’ Retirement System, Garrity joined a group of "dissident" board members opposing the contemporary management of the pension fund's investments, arguing instead that the pension fund should invest in low-fee, public investments. After failing to dismiss the fund's managers, the dissident group of board members, including Garrity's predecessor Joe Torsella, successfully blocked an investment strategy proposed by the fund managers in September 2021.

In 2022, Garrity opposed Pennsylvania governor Tom Wolf's proposal to award state employees with five days vacation from work if they got vaccinated for COVID-19, claiming that it would cost the state government one-hundred million dollars. The Wolf administration claimed that Garrity's cost estimate was seriously exaggerated. Pennsylvania Secretary of Administration Michael Newsome, whose position reports to the governor, estimated the cost of the vacation incentives to be $45 million.

On May 6, 2022, Garrity appeared at a rally with former president Trump and 2022 U.S. Senate candidate Mehmet Oz in Greensburg, at which she endorsed Trump's false claim that he won the 2020 presidential election.

References

External links 
 Government website
 Campaign website

Bloomsburg University of Pennsylvania alumni
Candidates in the 2019 United States elections
Living people
Military personnel from Pennsylvania
Pennsylvania Republicans
People from Bradford County, Pennsylvania
State treasurers of Pennsylvania
University of Pennsylvania alumni
Women in Pennsylvania politics
21st-century American women